Four Depressive Seasons is the debut album by Danish death metal band Illdisposed.

Track listing 
 Forbidden Summer Poetry - 3:55
 Reversed - 5:08
 Weeping Souls of Autumn Desires - 5:53
 Life Equals Zero (A Love Song) - 4:33
 A Deathwork Orange... - 7:41
 ...The Winter of Our Discontempt - 5:36
 Wardance of the Technocracy - 5:04
 Inherit the Wind - 4:52
 With the Lost Souls on Our Side - 4:40

Personnel 
 Bo Summer - vocals
 Lasse Bak - guitar
 Ronnie Bak - bass
 Michael Enevoldsen - drums

Additional lead guitar by Hans Wagner, all lyrics written by Bo Summer, all music written by Illdisposed.

References 

Illdisposed albums
1993 albums
Diehard Music albums